Kingston Park is a Tyne and Wear Metro station, serving the suburb of Kingston Park, Newcastle upon Tyne in Tyne and Wear, England. It joined the network on 15 September 1985.

History
The area surrounding Kingston Park was largely constructed during the late 1970s and early 1980s, meaning that a station did not appear as part of the original plans for the Tyne and Wear Metro network, as the area did not have the required population density.

Kingston Park has two platforms, which are staggered on opposite sides of the level crossing on Brunton Lane.

In October 2012, traffic enforcement cameras were installed at the level crossings at Kingston Park and Bank Foot. Similar cameras were installed at Callerton Parkway in 2008.

In 2018, the station, along with others on the Airport branch, were refurbished as part of the Metro: All Change programme. The project saw improvements to accessibility, security and energy efficiency, as well as the re-branding of the station to the new black and white corporate colour scheme.

The station was used by 443,907 passengers in 2017–18, making it the third-most-used station on the Airport branch, after South Gosforth (1,608,102) and Regent Centre (713,308).

Facilities 
Step-free access is available at all stations across the Tyne and Wear Metro network, with ramped access to both platforms at Kingston Park. The station is equipped with ticket machines, waiting shelter, seating, next train information displays, timetable posters, and an emergency help point on both platforms. Ticket machines are able to accept payment with credit and debit card (including contactless payment), notes and coins. The station is also fitted with smartcard validators, which feature at all stations across the network.

A pay and display car park (operated by Newcastle City Council) is available, with 96 spaces, plus four accessible spaces. There is also the provision for cycle parking, with five cycle pods available for use.

Services 
, the station is served by up to five trains per hour on weekdays and Saturday, and up to four trains per hour during the evening and on Sunday.

Rolling stock used: Class 599 Metrocar

Accidents and incidents
 On 22 March 1983, prior to the opening of the station, a Tyne and Wear Metro service collided with a bus operated by the Tyne and Wear PTE on the level crossing. Two people were injured in the accident.

References

External links

Timetable and station information for Kingston Park

Newcastle upon Tyne
1985 establishments in England
Railway stations in Great Britain opened in 1985
Tyne and Wear Metro Green line stations
Transport in Newcastle upon Tyne
Transport in Tyne and Wear
